The Huth Pit was a mine on the territory of Hamm (Sieg) in the county of Altenkirchen in the German state of Rhineland-Palatinate.

It is first recorded in 1560. In 1763 a consolidation took place. In 1867 underground mining was begun. The Old Shaft (Alte Schacht) of the pit had a depth  of 270 metres.

Spathic (carbonate) iron ores containing rhodochrosite were used around 1870s to produce spiegeleisen, a historically important ferromanganese alloy used in steelmaking.

Between 1890 and 1937 the mine was closed; it was then re-opened. That year a new shaft was driven, which had a diameter of 3.9 metres and reached a depth of 410 metres. The total depth (Gesamtteufe) of the pit was 465 metres. It had 70 employees and was close in September 1944.

See also 

 Mining in the Siegerland

References

External links 
 TK25 Sheet 5212 Wissen (1899)
 

Former mines in Germany
Iron mines in Germany
Siegerland
Westerwald
Economy of Rhineland-Palatinate
Altenkirchen (district)